Jimeno Garcés, sometimes Jimeno II (died 932/3), was the King of Pamplona from 925 until his death. He was the brother of King Sancho I Garcés and son of García Jiménez by his second wife, Dadildis of Pallars. When his brother died, Sancho's only son, García Sánchez, was still a child and Jimeno succeeded his brother, becoming the second ruler of the Jiménez dynasty.

Reign

In 927, Jimeno took an army south to support Muhammad ibn Lubb ibn Muhammad of the Banu Qasi against the Córdoba-allied Banu Tujib, and Jimeno's presence there forced Abd-ar-Rahman III, Emir of Córdoba to retreat without offering battle. By 928 at the latest Jimeno's nephew García was "formally associated ... as joint ruler". A document in the archives of the monastery of San Juan de la Peña confirming a boundary settlement reached under King Fortún Garcés was issued when "[the aforementioned King] Jimeno Garcés was ruling with his ward the Lord García in Pamplona and in [Deyo]." Upon his death in 932 or 933 his nephew, now García Sánchez I of Pamplona, ruled alone under the tutelage of his mother Toda, who was doubly Jimeno's sister-in-law.

Marriage and children

Jimeno married Sancha Aznárez, daughter of Aznar Sánchez of Larraun and granddaughter of king Fortún Garcés, and thus a sister of Sancho's queen, Toda Aznárez. As such, she was a close kinswoman of Abd-ar-Rahman III.  Sancha and Jimeno had three children: García, who went with his mother to Gascony; Sancho, who married Quissilo, daughter of García, count in Bailo; and Dadildis, wife of Muza Aznar, son of the wali of Huesca, al-Tawil, and grandson of Aznar Galíndez II of Aragon. By a mistress Jimeno had another son, also named García, who died at Córdoba.

Notes

Sources

930s deaths
10th-century Navarrese monarchs
Year of birth unknown